William Hesmer (born November 23, 1981 in Wilson, North Carolina) is a retired American soccer player who played as a goalkeeper.

Career

College
Hesmer played college soccer at Wake Forest University from 2000 to 2003, establishing himself as one of the nation's best goalkeepers at that level.  As a junior, Hesmer was named an NSCAA second team All-American, and as a senior was named a first team All-American.

Professional
After graduating from college, Hesmer was drafted 17th overall in the 2004 MLS SuperDraft by Kansas City Wizards. However, with Tony Meola starting in goal, and the very experienced Bo Oshoniyi as his backup, Hesmer was not able to establish himself, and finished the MLS season without playing a single minute, although he did take to the field – for one single minute in a game against Rochester Raging Rhinos – during a brief loan spell with the Richmond Kickers in the A-League.

In the 2006 season, Hesmer earned a handful of appearances, but did not make an impact on the first team. He was selected in the 2006 MLS Expansion Draft by Toronto FC, but was only with the club for a matter of hours before being dealt to Columbus Crew for a partial allocation. The 2007 season saw Hesmer establish himself as the first team keeper for the Crew. He started 20 matches for the Columbus club.

In the 2008 season Hesmer stopped penalty kicks in each of the Crew's first two matches, as well as a third against New England on May 8. He has been called into camp for the United States National Team but has yet to receive a cap.

He surpassed Jon Busch as the franchise's all-time shutout leader by earning his 26th in a 1–0 triumph over Kansas City Wizards at CommunityAmerica Ballpark on May 23, 2010.

Hesmer became the third goalkeeper in MLS history to score a goal in a 2–2 draw with Toronto FC at BMO Field on October 16, 2010. With the Crew trailing 2–1 in second-half stoppage time, he sprinted to the center of the Toronto FC penalty area as an extra attacker while an Eddie Gaven corner kick was in mid-flight. The ball was headed by Chad Marshall back to Hesmer, who was given enough time to trap, set and fire it into the net.

A fractured right shoulder resulting from a collision with Danny Califf in the 85th minute of a 3–1 victory over Philadelphia Union in the regular season finale at Columbus Crew Stadium on October 24, 2010 forced Hesmer to miss the playoffs.

He made his 100th league appearance for the Crew on March 26, 2011, keeping a clean sheet in a 0–0 tie with New York Red Bulls.

An ankle sprain suffered during the first day of preseason training, sidelined Hesmer to begin the 2012 season.  During the rehabilitation period, he made what would be his final appearance in the Black & Gold, starting and playing the first half for the Crew reserves in a 2–1 loss to the Montreal Impact reserves, following the Crew senior squad's home opener on March 24, 2012 at Columbus Crew Stadium.  In April, Hesmer was forced to undergo surgery on his right hip, which had been initially injured three years earlier, costing him the remainder of the season. At the end of the year, Columbus declined his 2013 contract option and Hesmer chose to enter the 2012 MLS Re-Entry Draft. On December 14, 2012, he was selected by Los Angeles Galaxy in stage two of the draft.

Despite being selected, Hesmer didn't sign with the Galaxy and opted to retire on February 19, 2013.

Will was signed to a 1-day contract with the Carolina Railhawks as a backup goalkeeper for their June 24, 2014 Open Cup match against the LA Galaxy.

His post-career plans involve working in wealth management for Raymond James in Raleigh, North Carolina.

Honors

Columbus Crew
Major League Soccer MLS Cup (1): 2008
Major League Soccer Supporter's Shield (2): 2008, 2009
Major League Soccer Eastern Conference Playoff (1): 2008
Major League Soccer Eastern Conference Regular Season (2): 2008, 2009

References

External links
 

1981 births
Living people
People from Wilson, North Carolina
American soccer players
Association football goalkeepers
Soccer players from North Carolina
Wake Forest Demon Deacons men's soccer players
Sporting Kansas City players
Richmond Kickers players
Columbus Crew players
A-League (1995–2004) players
Major League Soccer players
Sporting Kansas City draft picks
All-American men's college soccer players